Zandvoort is a municipality in the province of North Holland, Netherlands. It is one of the major beach resorts of the Netherlands; it has a long sandy beach. It is bordered by coastal dunes of Zuid-Kennemerland National Park and the Amsterdam water supply dunes. It hosts the country's most prominent motor racing circuit, Circuit Zandvoort.

The municipality of extends to take in Bentveld; it had a population of 16,954 in 2017. A nudist bathing section of the beach begins about 2 km to the south, with six eateries, which extends kilometers further.

History

Zandvoort is known to exist in 1100, called Sandevoerde (a combination of "sand" and "voorde", meaning ford; compare English Sandford). Until 1722 the area was under the control of the Lords of Brederode. The village was dependent on fishing for many centuries until the 19th century when it started to transform itself into a seaside resort, following the pattern set by similar towns in the United Kingdom. In 1828 the first resort was inaugurated. Thereafter many notable persons would visit Zandvoort, including Elisabeth of Bavaria in 1884 and 1885. In the middle of the same century, potato cultivation started in the dunes.

In 1881 the railway station near the coast opened, followed by tram connection to Haarlem in 1899, which greatly increased the beach tourism. In 1905 one of the earliest Dutch fictional films was shot in the town, De mésaventure van een Fransch heertje zonder pantalon aan het strand te Zandvoort. During World War II, Zandvoort was heavily damaged. On May 23, 1942, beach access was no longer permitted and several months later the town was almost completely vacated. Resorts and avenues were demolished to make way for the coastal fortifications of the Atlantic Wall.

After the war, the town's growth accelerated, matching the growth in tourism. In 1948, Circuit Zandvoort was built, hosting the Dutch Grand Prix for several decades, until 1985. The Dutch GP returned in 2021, in the 2021 Formula One World Championship. Zandvoort continues to be a major Dutch resort location, where nearly half of all employment is related to tourism. The Dutch singer Willem Duyn's De Eerste Trein Naar Zandvoort ("First train to Zandvoort"), modeled on the American song Chattanooga Choo Choo and chronicling chaos and mayhem on the first seaside train, was a hit in the summer of 1983.

Transport 
Zandvoort has a station, with half-hourly services to Haarlem and Amsterdam, with extra services from Haarlem during the summer. The station is Zandvoort aan Zee railway station.

Local government 
The municipal council of Zandvoort consists of 17 seats, which are divided as follows since 2022:

Notable people 
 William Merritt Chase (1849–1916) American Impressionist Painter painted his masterpiece entitled "Sunlight and Shadow" in Zandvoort. It hangs in the Joslyn Art Museum in Omaha, Nebraska. 
 Lovis Corinth (1858–1925) German artist and writer, painter and printmaker died of pneumonia in Zandvoort having made a final visit to see his favourite Dutch masters
 Bep Schrieke (1890–1945) politician and academic
 Lou Bandy (1890–1959) Dutch singer and conferencier
 Anne Frank (1929–1945) Jewish diarist and victim of the Holocaust, and her family used to regularly visit Zandvoort in the summer.
 Shirley Zwerus, stage name Shirley (born 1946) singer and pianist
 Hans Willem Blom (born 1947) Professor of Social and Political Philosophy at Erasmus University
 Stella Maessen (born 1953) singer, participated in the Eurovision Song Contests of 1970, 1977 and 1982
 A 2.5 m (8 ft) tall Lego figure was found in the sea at Zandvoort on 7 August 2007. It was fished out and placed on the beach. It was wearing a blue shirt with the slogan "No Real Than You Are" and red trousers. Its origins are unknown.

Sport 
 Elisabeth Koning (1917–1975) sprinter, competed in the women's 100 metres at the 1936 Summer Olympics
 Bep Ipenburg (born 1936) former artistic gymnast, competed at the 1960 Summer Olympics 
 Bert Jacobs (1941-1999) football manager and played for HFC Haarlem
 Roy Schuiten (1950–2006) track and road racing cyclist
 Loes Schutte (born 1953) retired rower, participated in 1976 Summer Olympics
 Jan Lammers (b.1956), former racing driver (Formula One)
 Piet Keur (b.1960), former football player
 Harriet van Ettekoven (born 1961) former international rower, won the bronze medal in the Women's Eights at the 1984 Summer Olympics
 Danny van Dongen (born 1983) racing driver and entrepreneur 
 Leroy Kaestner (born 1988) welterweight kickboxer

References

External links 

Official website

 
Municipalities of North Holland
Populated places in North Holland
Seaside resorts in the Netherlands